is a railway station operated by the Keisei Electric Railway located in Midori-ku, Chiba Japan. It is 7.3 kilometers from the terminus of the Keisei Chihara Line at Chiba-Chūō Station.

History
Gakuemmae Station was opened on 1 April 1995.

Station numbering was introduced to all Keisei Line stations on 17 July 2010; Gakuemmae Station was assigned station number KS63.

Lines
Keisei Electric Railway
Keisei Chihara Line

Layout
Gakuemmae Station has two elevated opposed side platforms, with a station building underneath.

Platforms

External links
  Keisei Station layout

References

Railway stations in Japan opened in 1995
Railway stations in Chiba Prefecture